Acmaturris is a genus of minute sea snails, marine gastropod mollusks or micromollusks in the family Mangeliidae.

Species
Species within the genus Acmaturris include:
 Acmaturris ampla McLean & Poorman, 1971
 Acmaturris brisis Woodring, 1928
 † Acmaturris comparata Woodring, 1928
 Acmaturris pelicanus Garcia, 2008
 † Acmaturris scalida Woodring 1928
Species brought into synonymy
 Acmaturris annaclaireleeae García, 2008: synonym of Pyrgocythara annaclaireleeae (García, 2008)
 Acmaturris metria (Dall, 1903): synonym of Vitricythara metria (Dall, 1903)
 Acmaturris vatovai Nordsieck, 1971: synonym of Kurtziella serga (Dall, 1881)

References

 W. P. Woodring. 1928. Miocene Molluscs from Bowden, Jamaica. Part 2: Gastropods and discussion of results . Contributions to the Geology and Palaeontology of the West Indies

External links
  Bouchet, P.; Kantor, Y. I.; Sysoev, A.; Puillandre, N. (2011). A new operational classification of the Conoidea. Journal of Molluscan Studies. 77, 273-308
  Tucker, J.K. 2004 Catalog of recent and fossil turrids (Mollusca: Gastropoda). Zootaxa 682:1-1295.
 Fossilworks: Acmaturris
 Todd, Jonathan A. "Systematic list of gastropods in the Panama Paleontology Project collections." Budd and Foster 2006 (1996)